Fatso-Fasano is an American film, television actor and musician. He is perhaps best known for playing Marvin on the television series Weeds from 2006 to 2012.

Filmography 
Weeds (2006–2012) (TV series) as Marvin (12 episodes), see List of Weeds episodes
It's Time, Part 2
It's Time, Part 1
Yes I Can
The Dark Time
He Taught Me How to Drive By
Grasshopper
Bill Sussman
The Brick Dance
A Pool and His Money
Doing the Backstroke
Pittsburgh
Yeah, Just Like Tomatoes
Soul Men (2008) as Pay-Pay
Welcome to the Captain (2008) (TV series) as Bouncer #1 (1 episode)
The Wrecking Crew
Rockin' Meera (2006) as Shorty
The Black Dahlia (2006) as Dealer
John Tucker Must Die (2006) as Tommy
Price to Pay (2006) as Boger
CSI: Crime Scene Investigation (2005) (TV series) as the Pretzel Vendor (1 episode)
Dog Eat Dog
Everybody Hates Chris (2005) (TV series) as D.J. (1 episode)
Everybody Hates Halloween
NYPD Blue (2004) (TV series) as Jamal (1 episode)
The Vision Thing (season 12)
The Handler (TV series) (2003) (TV series) as Bouncer (1 episode)
Street Boss
The Beat (2003) as Greyton

 The Way of the West

References

External links 

Living people
Year of birth missing (living people)
African-American male actors
African-American musicians
American male film actors
American male television actors
21st-century African-American people
21st-century American male actors